Souheib Dhaflaoui (born 8 May 1996) is a Danish professional footballer who plays as a winger for Danish 1st Division club Næstved Boldklub.

Private life
Dhaflaoui was born to Tunisian parents and has a Tunisian passport. He applied for a Danish passport, so he could play for Denmark. He has said that his favourite player is Philippe Coutinho.

Club career

Nordsjælland
In 2012 at the age of 16, Dhaflaoui signed a three-year youth contract with FC Nordsjælland from B.93. Dhaflaoui was wanted by many Danish clubs, after a game where he became matchwinner for the seniors of B.93 at the age of only 15 in February 2012.

At the age of 19, Dhaflaoui was promoted to the first team squad in July 2015 and did also sign a full-time senior contract with FCN in March 2015.

Dhaflaoui got his official debut for FCN on 3 August 2015. Dhaflaoui started on the bench, but replaced Emiliano Marcondes in the 93nd minut in a 2–1 victory against AaB in the Danish Superliga.

Loan to Helsingør

On 31 August 2016 it was confirmed, that Danish 1st Division-side, FC Helsingør, had signed Dhaflaoui on a loan. He got shirt number 27.

He played 8 league matches in the Danish 1st Division before leaving the club on 31 December 2016.

Back at Nordsjælland

After his loan stay at FC Helsingør, FCN announced on 7 January 2017, that Dhaflaoui together with one of his teammates, went on a trial in the United States at a four-day annual showcase called 'Super Draft' in the MLS Combine, trying to gain a contract in the Major League Soccer.

Dhaflaoui didn't play a single match after his return from his loan stay, and was only in the squad for one league match, where he sat on the bench the whole game. FC Nordsjælland confirmed on 30 May 2017, that Dhaflaoui's contract wouldn't be extended and he would leave the club at the end of it, which was on 1 July 2017.

Næstved
On 31 July 2017 it was confirmed, that Dhaflaoui together with his friend, Tarik Mourihrib, had joined the Danish 2nd Division club Næstved BK. He left the club at the end of the 2018/19 season.

Roskilde
Dhaflaoui joined FC Roskilde on 23 July 2019.

Return to B93
On 4 September 2020 it was confirmed, that Dhaflaoui had returned to B.93.

Return to Næstved
On 7 June 2022 Dhaflaoui confirmed, that he had signed with his former - and newly promoted Danish 1st Division - club Næstved BK for the upcoming 2022-23 season.

References

External links
 

1995 births
Living people
Tunisian footballers
Danish Superliga players
Danish 1st Division players
Danish 2nd Division players
Boldklubben af 1893 players
FC Nordsjælland players
FC Helsingør players
Næstved Boldklub players
FC Roskilde players
Place of birth missing (living people)
Association football midfielders
Association football wingers
Footballers from Copenhagen
Danish people of Tunisian descent